Fort Brewerton is a historic fort site located at Brewerton in Oswego County, New York. It is the site of a fort that originally was in the form of an eight-pointed star with sixteen  faces surrounded by a  moat. Within the parapet were four log blockhouses, smaller buildings for munitions and supplies, and wells. It was erected in 1759 to defend the passage from Albany to the port of Oswego.

It was listed on the National Register of Historic Places in 1973.

The Fort Brewerton Historical Society operates the Oliver Stevens Blockhouse Museum, with excavated artifacts and exhibits about the fort and area history.  The museum is a log reconstruction of a late 18th-century log block house that was located on the site.  The museum is open on Saturdays from June through September.

References

External links
Fort Brewerton Historical Society's Museum website

Brewerton
Archaeological sites in New York (state)
Brewerton
Museums in Oswego County, New York
Parks in Oswego County, New York
Historical society museums in New York (state)
Brewerton
National Register of Historic Places in Oswego County, New York